Karizak may refer to:
 Karizak, Khalilabad, Razavi Khorasan Province
 Karizak, Sarakhs, Razavi Khorasan Province
 Karizak-e Hajji Pasand, Razavi Khorasan Province
 Karizak-e Kenar Kal, Razavi Khorasan Province
 Karizak-e Khujui, Razavi Khorasan Province
 Karizak-e Kohneh, Razavi Khorasan Province
 Karizak-e Nagahani, Razavi Khorasan Province
 Karizak-e Yaqubkhani, Razavi Khorasan Province

See also
 Kahrizak (disambiguation)